John McKendrick KC (born 1976) is a British lawyer, author, and the attorney general of Anguilla.

McKendrick was born in Alexandria, Scotland, and went to school in Glasgow. He has an LLB from the London School of Economics, an LLM from the University of Leuven, and an MSc from the University of Oxford. McKendrick was called to the English Bar in 1999, the Scottish Bar in 2008 and the Bar of the Eastern Caribbean Supreme Court in 2013. He has worked in Central America at the invitation of the British Government. He was appointed convener for the Additional Support Needs Tribunals for Scotland in 2010, was Times Lawyer of the Week in September 2013, and nominated for The Lawyer magazine's Barrister of the Year award for 2016.

In February 2016 he was appointed QC and in June he was appointed attorney general of Anguilla, beginning a two-year term in September of the same year.

McKendrick's book Darien: A Journey in Search of Empire was published by Birlinn in February 2016. The book is a historical account of Scotland's unsuccessful attempt to establish a colony on the isthmus of Panama, intertwined with autobiography. He appeared at the Edinburgh International Book Festival in August 2016.

In the 2007 Scottish Parliament election, McKendrick stood as the Labour candidate for Caithness, Sutherland and Easter Ross, coming third with 14.1% of the vote. In the UK general election of May 2010, McKendrick stood as the Labour candidate in the Scottish constituency of Ross, Skye & Lochaber. He gained 15.1% of the vote and came second to Charles Kennedy, former leader of the Liberal Democrats. Receiving 5,265 votes, McKendrick finished two votes ahead of SNP candidate Alasdair Stephen.

McKendrick is a freeman of the town of Winchelsea, making him a member of the "only unreformed corporation in the country". He speaks fluent Spanish.

References

Attorneys General of Anguilla
Living people
People from Alexandria, West Dunbartonshire
1976 births
Scottish Labour parliamentary candidates
People from Winchelsea